The following elections occurred in the year 1938.

Africa
 1938 South African general election

Asia
 1938 Philippine general election
 1938 Philippine legislative election
 1938 Soviet Union regional elections

Europe
 1938 Estonian parliamentary election
 1938 Irish general election
 1938 Irish presidential election
 1938 Kingdom of Yugoslavia parliamentary election
 1938 Polish legislative election
 1938 Portuguese legislative election
 1938 Soviet Union regional elections
 1938 German election and referendum

United Kingdom
 1938 Barnsley by-election
 1938 Bridgwater by-election
 1938 City of London by-election
 1938 Combined Scottish Universities by-election
 1938 Lewisham West by-election
 1938 Northern Ireland general election
 1938 Oxford by-election
 1938 Walsall by-election

North America
 Nicaraguan Constitutional Assembly election, 1938

Canada
 1938 Conservative Party of Ontario leadership election
 1938 Edmonton municipal election
 1938 Ottawa municipal election
 1938 Saskatchewan general election

United States
 United States House of Representatives elections in California, 1938
 1938 California gubernatorial election
 1938 Minnesota gubernatorial election
 1938 New York state election
 United States House of Representatives elections in South Carolina, 1938
 1938 South Carolina gubernatorial election
 1938 United States House of Representatives elections
 1938 United States Senate elections
 United States Senate election in South Carolina, 1938

Oceania
 1938 New Zealand general election

Australia
 1938 New South Wales state election
 1938 Queensland state election
 1938 South Australian state election
 1938 Wakefield by-election

South America
 1938 Chilean presidential election
 1938 Argentine legislative election

See also
 :Category:1938 elections

1938
Elections